Lassina Diaby is an Ivorian footballer who currently plays as a striker for Al-Saqer.

References 

Living people
1992 births
Ivorian footballers
Lekhwiya SC players
Qatar SC players
Al-Gharafa SC players
Al-Khor SC players
Al Kharaitiyat SC players
Saham SC players
Qadsia SC players
Khaleej FC players
Al Batin FC players
Al-Nojoom FC players
Al-Saqer FC players
Qatar Stars League players
Oman Professional League players
Saudi First Division League players
Saudi Second Division players
Expatriate footballers in Qatar
Expatriate footballers in Oman
Expatriate footballers in Kuwait
Expatriate footballers in Saudi Arabia
Ivorian expatriate sportspeople in Qatar
Ivorian expatriate sportspeople in Oman
Ivorian expatriate sportspeople in Kuwait
Ivorian expatriate sportspeople in Saudi Arabia

Association football forwards
Kuwait Premier League players